Brachioteuthis bowmani is a species of squid in the family Brachioteuthidae.

References 

Animals described in 1909
Squid